The BMW M1 (model code E26) is a mid-engined sports car produced by German automotive manufacturer BMW from 1978 until 1981.

In the late 1970s, Italian automobile manufacturer Lamborghini entered into an agreement with BMW to build a production racing car in sufficient quantity for homologation, but conflicts arose that prompted BMW to produce the car themselves.  The resulting car was sold to the public, from 1978 until 1981, as the BMW M1.

It is the first mid-engine BMW automobile to be mass-produced; the second is the i8 plug-in hybrid sports car.

Overview

Development history 

The motorsport division of BMW headed by Jochen Neerpasch had been wanting to compete in motorsports using a car developed for competition racing in order to compete with arch rival Porsche in Group-5 racing, thus the development of the M1 was initiated. Neerpasch, who was head of the development program stressed that the car was to be strictly mid-engine in order to outclass its competitors. As BMW wasn't able to build 400 road going examples of the car in the required time period as stipulated by the rules, the company partnered with Lamborghini to work out the details of the car's chassis, assemble prototypes and manufacture the vehicles. The tubular steel space frame chassis was the work of Gianpaolo Dallara but soon Lamborghini's financial position and the possibility of the car's production by the Italian manufacturer became bleak and BMW reassumed control over the project in April 1978, after seven prototypes were built. The delay in production and the changes in Group 5 rules forced the company to compete in Group 4 racing with the car.

The M1 coupé was hand-built between 1978 and 1981 under the motorsport division of BMW as a homologation special for sports car racing. The fibre glass body was designed by Giorgetto Giugiaro, taking inspiration from the 1972 BMW Turbo concept car. Since the engineering of the car was still incomplete, a group of former Lamborghini engineers had founded a company named Italengineering which offered to complete the car's design. Less than 10 miles away from the Lamborghini shop, the engineering for the M1 was finished.

Engine and transmission 

The BMW M1 is the first car to be solely developed by BMW M and employs a  M88/1 petrol six-cylinder engine with Kugelfischer-Bosch mechanical fuel injection and Magneti-Marelli ignition system. The engine was developed by Paul Rosche, who was also responsible for the S14 inline-4 engine and the S70/2 V12 engine. A version of this engine was later used in the South African version of the 745i, of which 209 examples were built between 1984 and 1986, as well as the E24 M6/M635CSi and E28 M5. The engine was mated to a 5-speed manual transmission made by ZF Friedrichshafen equipped with a 40% locking limited slip differential.

Steering, suspension and brakes 
The M1 has an unassisted rack and pinion steering, double-wishbone suspension system with adjustable coil springs and Bilstein gas filled dampers. The road car had softer suspension bushings to have better ride quality and tractability.

The M1 used special Campagnolo alloy wheels measuring 7x16-inches at the front and 8x16-inches at the rear fitted with Pirelli P7 tyres (having sizes of 205/55 VR15 at the front and 225/50 VR15s at the rear).

Interior 

The M1 has a half-leather and half-cloth interior. Its motorsport roots meant that the car had a basic interior layout with many parts sourced from other BMW models. The interior had amenities such as air conditioning, power windows and a stereo but had unadjustable seats and only had a left-hand-drive configuration.

Production 
The fibre glass body of the M1 was manufactured by Italian firm Italiana Resina which was located in Modena, Italy. The chassis was manufactured by another Modenese firm, Marchesi. The body of the car was completed by Italdesign at their manufacturing facility located in Turin along with the interior.

The partly finished cars were then delivered to 
German specialist manufacturer Baur where final assembly took place by hand. The hand-built M88/1 engines were supplied by BMW from Munich to be installed in the cars. The completed cars were shipped to BMW Motorsport in Munich for final inspection and delivery. Only 453 production cars were built, making it one of BMW's rarest models. Out of the 453, 399 were road going units while 53 were made for motorsport.

Accolades 

The M1 had various successes in motorsports. In 2004, Sports Car International placed the car at number ten on their list of top sports cars of the 1970s.

Motorsport 

In 1979 the head of BMW Motorsport, Jochen Neerpasch, devised a one-make championship using racing modified M1s. The series was created to aid BMW in building enough cars to enter the group 4 classification in the World Championship for Makes. The new series, known as the "Procar BMW M1 Championship", served as a support series for Formula One, and included many Formula One drivers in identical cars.

The series ran for two years, with Niki Lauda winning the 1979 season, and Nelson Piquet the 1980 season. After BMW met the standards for group 4, the Procars were used by various teams in the world championship as well as other national series.

The M1 was also campaigned at the 24 Hours of Le Mans from 1981 to 1986 where it proved competitive. The car was classified as a Group B car for Le Mans purposes, as Group B was also planned for GT class for road races, but were instead eclipsed by Group C prototypes.

A M1 Pro Car was also converted to Group B rally spec by BMW France for the 1982 season. The car was campaigned for the 1983 season as well before the car was entered solely by the Motul privateer racing team for the 1984 season. The 1984 season proved to be the most successful for the M1 as former ERC champion Bernard Béguin won back-to-back at Rallye de La Baule and Rallye de Lorraine that season, and even claimed an outright ERC podium at Rally d’Antibes four months later. The car was not campaigned further after 1984.

Commemorative cars and spiritual successor

M1 Homage concept 

In April 2008, BMW unveiled the M1 Homage concept, to commemorate the 30th anniversary of the M1. The concept vehicle uses a mid-engine layout that borrows styling cues from both the original M1 and the BMW Turbo show car.

The design was penned by BMW's in-house design team, inspired by both the original M1 and the BMW Turbo concept designed by Paul Bracq. The BMW Turbo had many technical and advanced innovations from BMW that were part of the inspiration of the M1 Homage concept. The front of the car differs the most from the other parts of the car. The front sports double head lights which are not the same as pop-up type that are on the original M1, but the usual trademark of the kidney grilles is present. The M1 Homage also incorporates the double badge on the back of the car like the original M1. There are no photos of the interior of the car or of the car in action, nor have the specifications of the car been released as the car was meant only to be a design exercise.

Vision EfficientDynamics concept and the BMW i8 

After the M1, BMW designed some mid engined concept cars but none of them inspired a production car until 2013, when the Vision EfficientDynamics concept led to the production of the i8. The BMW i8 is based on the Vision EfficientDynamics concept, which is a range-extender electric car with a three-cylinder turbocharged petrol engine. The production car was designed by Benoit Jacob. Series production of customer vehicles began in April 2014. It is also the first mass-produced mid-engine BMW automobile since the M1.

Vision M Next concept 
The Vision M Next is a plug-in hybrid concept sports car that was showcased in June 2019. The design is partially inspired from the M1, such as louvered rear windows and BMW roundels positioned inside the taillamps. It is powered by the Power PHEV drivetrain system that offers the choice between all-wheel-drive and rear-wheel-drive, with either all-electric propulsion or the power of a turbocharged four-cylinder petrol engine. The maximum range when driving in all-electric mode is claimed to be .

References 

M1
Cars introduced in 1978
Rear mid-engine, rear-wheel-drive vehicles
Italdesign vehicles
Coupés
Sports cars